Pierre Bonnet (July 20, 1910 – September 28, 1983) was a French boxer who competed in the 1936 Summer Olympics.

In 1936, he was eliminated in the first round of the bantamweight class after losing his fight to Antoni Czortek.

External links
Pierre Bonnet's profile at Sports Reference.com

1910 births
1983 deaths
Bantamweight boxers
Olympic boxers of France
Boxers at the 1936 Summer Olympics
French male boxers